Maccabi Bnei Reineh is an Israeli football club based in Reineh. The club played its home matches at the Municipal Stadium. They were promoted to play with Bnei Sakhnin in the Israeli Premier League as its second Arab-Israeli football club for the 2022-23 season.

History
In the 1990s and 2000s, Maccabi Bnei Reineh played in Liga Gimel and didn't achieve significant achievements. In 2008 the club was folded. In 2016, the club refounded by a local businessman named Saeed Basul, and at the end of the 2016–17 season, the team finished in first place in Liga Gimel Jezreel, and promoted to Liga Bet.

At 2019–20 Israel State Cup qualified to the round of 16, there loss 1–3 to Beitar Jerusalem. At the end of the season promoted to Liga Alef. On 23 September 2020, the club IFA's tribunal ruled, Reineh will play in the next season in Liga Alef, after the previous season stopped due to the COVID-19 epidemic.

On 6 May 2022 the club promoted to the Israeli Premier League at the first time in the history of the team after 1–0 win against Hapoel Umm al-Fahm. In doing so, the team completed three consecutive league promotions in three seasons.

Stadium
Until 2021, Reineh played in the Municipal Stadium in Reineh.

After the club promoted to Liga Leumit moved to Green Stadium, Nof HaGalil because the M unicipal Stadium wasn't approved to host matches in Liga Leumit.

Current squad 
 As to 23 January 2023

Honours
Liga Leumit
Winners (1): 2021-22

Coaching Staff

References

External links 
 Maccabi Bnei Reineh Israel Football Association 

Bnei Reineh
Association football clubs established in 2016
Association football clubs established in 2005
Association football clubs disestablished in 2008
2005 establishments in Israel
2016 establishments in Israel
2008 disestablishments in Israel
Arab-Israeli football clubs